Zacardi Renye Louis Cortez (born September 17, 1985) is an American gospel musician and Christian R&B artist. He started his music career, in 2012, with the release of The Introduction by Blacksmoke Records. His second album, REloaded, was released by WorldWide Records in 2014. Both albums charted on the Billboard magazine Gospel Albums chart. His first release was more successful with chartings on The Billboard 200, Independent Albums, and R&B Albums charts.

Early life
Cortez was born in Houston, Texas on September 17, 1985, as Zacardi Renye Louis Cortez. His spiritual and music mentor, John P. Kee, was an influence upon his life, while they were touring together, and Kee even had Cortez featured on his album in 2005, Live at the Fellowship. After this, Cortez joined in James Fortune's band FIYA for a guest spot on The Transformation that was released in 2007.

Music career
His music career got started in 2012, with the release of The Introduction by Blacksmoke Records on May 22, 2012. This was his breakthrough release upon the Billboard magazine charts, with it placing on The Billboard 200 at No. 73, Gospel Albums at No. 2, Independent Albums at No. 16, and R&B Albums at No. 8. He released, REloaded, with WorldWide Records in 2014, yet this only charted on the Gospel Albums at No. 10. He performs on the single, "It's You (A Love Song)," which was released by Cheneta Jones.

Discography

Singles

References

External links
 Official website

1985 births
Living people
African-American songwriters
African-American Christians
Musicians from Houston
Songwriters from Texas
21st-century African-American people
20th-century African-American people